Alanzo Adlam (born 12 March 1989) is a Jamaican international footballer who plays for Portmore United, as a striker.

Career
Adlam has played club football for Sporting Central Academy and Portmore United. Adlam signed a season long loan to IFK Mariehamn in Finland in 2013.

International career 

Adlam also played for Jamaica U20 national team since 2006.  He made his international debut for Jamaica in 2012.

Honours 
Portmore United
 Winner (1): 2012 Jamaica National Premier League

References

1989 births
Living people
Jamaican footballers
Jamaica international footballers
Jamaican expatriate footballers
Jamaica under-20 international footballers
Portmore United F.C. players
IFK Mariehamn players
Sporting Central Academy players
2009 CONCACAF U-20 Championship players
Association football forwards
National Premier League players
Veikkausliiga players
Expatriate footballers in Finland
Pan American Games silver medalists for Jamaica
Pan American Games medalists in football
Medalists at the 2007 Pan American Games
Footballers at the 2007 Pan American Games